Welves Santos Damacena (born 24 November 2000) is a Brazilian footballer who plays for Portuguese club Fontinhas on loan from Trofense as a forward.

Career statistics

Club

References

2000 births
Sportspeople from Bahia
Living people
Brazilian footballers
Association football forwards
FC Lokomotíva Košice players
FC Lviv players
Zira FK players
Nõmme Kalju FC players
C.D. Trofense players
2. Liga (Slovakia) players
Ukrainian Premier League players
Azerbaijan Premier League players
Meistriliiga players
Liga Portugal 2 players
Brazilian expatriate footballers
Brazilian expatriate sportspeople in Slovakia
Expatriate footballers in Slovakia
Brazilian expatriate sportspeople in Ukraine
Expatriate footballers in Ukraine
Brazilian expatriate sportspeople in Azerbaijan
Expatriate footballers in Azerbaijan
Brazilian expatriate sportspeople in Estonia
Expatriate footballers in Estonia
Brazilian expatriate sportspeople in Portugal
Expatriate footballers in Portugal